is a Ryukyuan gusuku in Uruma, Okinawa. It was controlled by the Ōgawa Aji of Agena Castle until it was destroyed by the Ryukyu Kingdom.

References

Castles in Okinawa Prefecture